Khil Fiat Kikan (also Romanized as Khīl Fīāt Kīkan) is a village in Bazan Rural District, in the Central District of Javanrud County, Kermanshah Province, Iran. At the 2006 census, its population was 110, in 20 families.

References 

Populated places in Javanrud County